Emergency Landing is a 1952 Norwegian war film directed by Arne Skouen. It was entered into the 1952 Cannes Film Festival. The film depicts the Norwegian resistance attempting to hide shot-down American aviators from the German occupation forces.

Plot
An American bomber is shot down on the Norwegian coast during World War II. The airmen bail out and land at different locations. In spite of the German search for them, the Norwegian resistance picks them up and hides them in the attic of the local church, a center of operations. Things become tense, however, when the hideout is spotted by a notorious collaborator, and soon the protagonist, Hans (Henki Kolstad), has to get the airmen to Sweden.

Cast
 Henki Kolstad - Hans
 Jack Kennedy - Eddie, captain
 Randi Kolstad - Kristin
 Bjarne Andersen - Stråmannen
 Jens Bolling - Knut
 Einar Vaage - Edvartsen, churchwarden
 Samuel Matlowsky - Leo, sergeant
 Lee Payant - Fiorello, 2nd lt.
 John Robbins - Don, sergeant
 Lee Zimmer - Steve, sergeant
 Chris Bugge - Mart, 1st lt.
 Joachim Holst-Jensen - Willie, the vicar (as J. Holst Jensen)

References

External links

1952 films
1950s Norwegian-language films
Norwegian black-and-white films
Films about shot-down aviators
Films set in Norway
Films directed by Arne Skouen
Norwegian World War II films
1952 war films
Films about Norwegian resistance movement